Marcelo Luis Do Nascimento (born 20 October 1980) is a Brazilian professional boxer. At regional level, he has challenged once for the PABA heavyweight title in 2012, and the PABA interim heavyweight title in 2014.

Professional career
Nascimento faced undefeated heavyweight Tyson Fury on 19 February 2011 at Wembley Arena in London. Nascimento was knocked down in the first round and lost the fight via knockout in the fifth round.

On 26 April 2014, Nascimento was a late replacement for Joseph Parker on the undercard of Wladimir Klitschko's world heavyweight title defence against Australian Alex Leapai. He was stopped after a flurry of blows in the seventh round, although Nascimento protested the decision.

Nascimento faced Dillian Whyte on 7 February 2015 at the Camden Centre. Nascimento was knocked down once in the 1st round, and twice in the 2nd, losing the fight via knockout.

Nascimento faced Demsey McKean on 16 March 2019 at the Southport Sharks AFL Club in Queensland. The referee stopped the fight in the second round after Nascimento was knocked down three times.

Professional boxing record

Kickboxing record
{{Kickboxing record start|norec=y|title=Kickboxing record|record=0 Wins (0 KO's), 1 Loss, 0 Draw}}
|-  style="background:#fbb;"
| 2008-08-16 || Loss ||align=left| Tsuyoshi Yokoyama || DEEP: Gladiators || Okayama, Japan || Decision (unanimous) || 3 || 3:00
|-
| colspan=9 | Legend''':

References

External links
 

|}

1980 births
Living people
Brazilian male boxers
Heavyweight boxers
People from Suzano